Zeydin Yusup, also known as Zeydin Kari or Ziauddin Yusuf, was one of main leaders of the Free Turkistan Movement.

History
In 1988 Abdul Kasim and Zeydin Yusup started the group which was originally called Free Turkistan Movement. The movement was disbanded after the   Baren uprising was crushed by Chinese security forces on April 10, 1990.

Zeydin Yusup was the mastermind behind the Baren Township conflict, one of the first major incidents in the Xinjiang conflict in the 1990s.

Baren Township incident

During the Baren Township conflict, Yusup was killed in a firefight with Chinese government forces.

References

1960 births
1990 deaths
East Turkestan independence activists
Uyghurs
East Turkestan independence movement